Simon P. Coker was a farmer who served in the South Carolina House of Representatives from 1874 until his assassination in 1876. He represented Barnwell County, South Carolina.

He was assassinated by white supremacists in 1876 during the Ellenton massacre in September 1876. He was one of between thirty to fifty black republicans executed that day., Coker was shot in the head while praying for mercy.

See also
Redeemers

References

Republican Party members of the South Carolina House of Representatives
People from Barnwell County, South Carolina
Year of birth missing
1876 deaths
Deaths by firearm in South Carolina
Assassinated American politicians
Farmers from South Carolina
African-American state legislators in South Carolina
African-American farmers
African-American politicians during the Reconstruction Era

Assassinated American State House representatives